A fiant was a writ issued to the Irish Chancery mandating the issue of letters patent under the Great Seal of Ireland. The name  comes from the opening words of the document, Latin for "Let letters patent be made". Fiants were typically issued by the chief governor of Ireland, under his privy seal; or sealed by the Secretary of State, who served as "Keeper of the Privy Seal of Ireland", just as the English Secretary of State did in England. Fiants dealt with matters ranging from appointments to high office and important government activities, to grants of pardons to the humblest of the native Irish. Fiants relating to early modern Ireland are an important primary source for the period for historians and genealogists. The Tudor  fiants were especially numerous, many relating to surrender and regrant. A fiant often provides more information than the ensuing letters patent recorded on patent rolls.  There are also fiants for which the patent roll does not list any letters patent, either because none were issued or because those issued were never enrolled, through accident or abuse. Prior to the Act of Explanation 1665, letters patent were enrolled (if at all) after they were granted; under the act, the fiant was enrolled first, and the letters issued afterwards. Thereafter the rolls, which were catalogued in the 19th century, give the same information as the original fiants.

The Public Record Office of Ireland (PROI) held Chancery fiants from 1521 (Henry VIII) up to 1891 (Victoria), as well as Crown and Hanaper fiants (1619–1873), Privy Council of Ireland fiant books (1711–1832), and Signet Office (Chief Secretary for Ireland) fiant books (1796–1830). The originals were destroyed in the 1922 explosion in the Four Courts. The fiants of the Tudor sovereigns had been calendared and published from 1875–90. An 1820s manuscript calendar of the fiants of James I and Charles I is available in the PROI (now the National Archives of Ireland).

References

Sources
Primary

Secondary

Citations

Early Modern Ireland
Writs